PSR J1141−6545 is a pulsar in the constellation of Musca (the fly). Located at  11h 41m 07.02s −65° 45′ 19.1″, it is a binary pair composed of a white dwarf star orbiting a pulsar.
 Because of this unusual configuration and the close proximity of the two stars it has been used to test several of Einstein's theories. 

PSR J1141−6545 is notable because it has shown several relativistic theories to have real-world results. The star is emitting gravitational waves and the process of time dilation appears to be affecting the orbit of the white dwarf. In January 2020 it was announced that the stars were also showing the Lense-Thirring effect, whereby a rotating mass drags the surrounding spacetime with it.

References 

Binary stars
Pulsars
Musca (constellation)
White dwarfs